Hassouneh Yousef Qasem Al-Sheikh (born 26 January 1977) is a retired Jordanian footballer of Palestinian origin.

Retirement
Hassouneh retired internationally after playing the match between his country Jordan and Kuwait in the 2010 WAFF Championship, in which he entered as a substitute for his teammate Ahmad Abdel-Halim. That match resulted in a 2–2 draw.

A friendly match was played between his country Jordan and Uzbekistan at the Amman International Stadium on 13 August 2012 to mark his international retirement. Hassouneh gave the captain arm band to the goalkeeper Amer Shafi and his #8 jersey shirt to his younger teammate from Al-Faisaly Khalil Bani Attiah after playing the first few minutes of the match.

Hassouneh retired from playing football entirely in 2014. A friendly match was played between Hassouneh's team Al-Faisaly and Zamalek SC at the Amman International Stadium on 3 September 2017, which resulted in a 2–2 draw.

Honors and participation in international tournaments

In AFC Asian Cups
2004 Asian Cup

In Pan Arab Games
1997 Pan Arab Games
1999 Pan Arab Games

In Arab Nations Cup
1998 Arab Nations Cup
2002 Arab Nations Cup

In WAFF Championships
2000 WAFF Championship
2002 WAFF Championship
2004 WAFF Championship
2007 WAFF Championship
2008 WAFF Championship
2010 WAFF Championship

International goals

See also
 List of men's footballers with 100 or more international caps

References

 Hassouneh Al-Sheikh to Al-Riffa of Bahrain 
 Al-Sheikh Joins Al-Busaiteen of Bahrain to Be Out on Loan 
 Jordanian Hassouneh Al-Sheikh to Al-Jaish of Syria
 Uzbekistan Defeat Jordan in a Friendly Marking Hassouneh Al-Sheikh's International Retirement

External links
 
 
 

1977 births
Living people
Association football midfielders
Jordanian footballers
Dubai CSC players
Jordan international footballers
Jordanian people of Palestinian descent
Jordanian expatriates in Bahrain
Expatriate footballers in Bahrain
Expatriate footballers in Syria
Al-Faisaly SC players
Sportspeople from Amman
FIFA Century Club
Syrian Premier League players